Carlos Zeballos is a former Canadian footballer who played in the Canadian National Soccer League, Uruguayan División Intermedia and the Canadian Soccer League.

Playing career 
Zeballos played with Scarborough Astros of the Canadian National Soccer League from 1993 till 1995. In 1997, he signed with Toronto Supra where he helped the club clinch a postseason berth. In the first round of the playoffs he helped Supra defeat Toronto Croatia by a score of 8-1 on goals on aggregate. In the CNSL Championship finals Toronto faced St. Catharines Roma Wolves, but lost the series by a score of 4-3 on goals on aggregate. In 2005, he played with Club River Plate of the Paraguayan División Intermedia where he featured in four matches. In 2006, he returned to Canada to sign with his former club Toronto Supra (now playing under the name Toronto Supra Portuguese) in the Canadian Soccer League. In 2008, he signed with North York Astros (formerly Scarborough Astros) where he helped the club clinch a postseason berth by finishing second in the National Division. At the conclusion of the season he was awarded the CSL Defender of the Year award.

References 

Living people
North York Astros players
SC Toronto players
River Plate (Asunción) footballers
Serbian White Eagles FC players
Canadian National Soccer League players
Canadian Soccer League (1998–present) players
Canadian people of Uruguayan descent
Sportspeople of Uruguayan descent
Canadian soccer players
Association football defenders
Association football forwards
Year of birth missing (living people)